The Women's 5000 metres event at the 2010 Commonwealth Games took place on 12 October 2010 at the Jawaharlal Nehru Stadium.

Final

References

Men's 5000 metres
2010
2010 in women's athletics